The 2016 New Mexico House of Representatives elections took place as part of the biennial United States elections. New Mexico voters elected state representatives in all 70 of the state house's districts. State representatives serve two-year terms in the New Mexico House of Representatives. The election coincided with elections for other offices, including the Presidency, the special election for Secretary of State, the U.S. House, and the State Senate.

A primary election held on June 7, 2016 determined which candidates appear on the November 8th general election ballot.

Results summary

Incumbents defeated in the primary election
Idalia Lechuga-Tena (D-District 21), defeated by Debra Sariñana (D)

Incumbents defeated in the general election
Paul Pacheco (R-District 23), defeated by Daymon Ely (D)
Andy Nuñez (R-District 36), defeated by Nathan Small (D)
Terry McMillan (R-District 37), defeated by Joanne Ferrary (D)
John L. Zimmerman (R-District 39), defeated by Rodolpho Martinez (D)

Open seats that changed parties
Conrad James (R-District 24) didn't seek re-election, seat won by Liz Thomson (D)

Detailed results

Source:New Mexico Secretary of State

District 1
Incumbent Republican Rod Montoya has represented the 1st district since 2015.

District 2
Incumbent Republican James Strickler has represented the 2nd district since 2007.

District 3
Incumbent Republican Paul Bandy has represented the 3rd district since 2007.

District 4
Incumbent Republican Sharon Clahchischilliage has represented the 4th district since 2013.

District 5
Incumbent Democrat Doreen Wonda Johnson has represented the 5th district since 2015.

District 6
Incumbent Democrat Eliseo Alcon has represented the 6th district since 2009.

District 7
Incumbent Republican Kelly Fajardo has represented the 7th district since 2013.

District 8
Incumbent Republican Alonzo Baldonado has represented the 8th district since 2011.

District 9
Incumbent Democrat Patricia Lundstrom has represented the 9th district since 2003.

District 10
Incumbent Democrat Andrés Romero has represented the 10th district since 2015.

District 11
Incumbent Democrat Javier Martinez has represented the 11th district since 2015.

District 12
Incumbent Democrat Patricio Ruiloba has represented the 12th district since 2015.

District 13
Incumbent Democrat Patricia Roybal Caballero has represented the 13th district since 2013.

District 14
Incumbent Democrat Miguel Garcia has represented the 14th district since 1997.

District 15
Incumbent Republican Sarah Maestas Barnes has represented the 15th district since 2015.

District 16
Incumbent Democrat Moe Maestas has represented the 16th district since 2007.

District 17
Incumbent Democrat Deborah Armstrong has represented the 17th district since 2015.

District 18
Incumbent Democrat Gail Chasey has represented the 18th district since 1997.

District 19
Incumbent Democrat Sheryl Williams Stapleton has represented the 19th district since 1995.

District 20
Incumbent Republican Jim Dines has represented the 20th district since 2015.

District 21
Incumbent Democrat Idalia Lechuga-Tena has represented the 21st district since 2015. Lechuga-Tena lost re-nomination to fellow Democrat Debra Sariñana, who was unopposed in the general election.

District 22
Incumbent Republican James Smith has represented the 22nd district since 2011.

District 23
Incumbent Republican Paul Pacheco has represented the 23rd district since 2013. He lost re-election to Democrat Daymon Ely.

District 24
Incumbent Republican Conrad James has represented the 24th district since 2015. James didn't seek re-election and former Democratic incumbent Liz Thomson won the open seat.

District 25
Incumbent Democrat Christine Trujillo has represented the 25th district since 2013.

District 26
Incumbent Democrat Georgene Louis has represented the 26th district since 2013.

District 27
Incumbent Republican Larry Larrañaga has represented the 27th district since 1995.

District 28
Incumbent Republican Jimmie Hall has represented the 28th district since 2005.

District 29
Incumbent Republican David Adkins has represented the 29th district since 2015.

District 30
Incumbent Republican Nate Gentry has represented the 30th district since 2011.

District 31
Incumbent Republican Bill Rehm has represented the 31st district since 2007.

District 32
Incumbent Democrat Dona Irwin has represented the 32nd district since 1999. Irwin retired and fellow Democrat Candie Sweetser won the open seat.

District 33
Incumbent Democrat Bill McCamley has represented the 33rd district since 2013.

District 34
Incumbent Democrat Bealquin "Bill" Gomez has represented the 34th district since 2015.

District 35
Incumbent Democrat Jeff Steinborn has represented the 35th district since 2013. Steinborn retired to run for the New Mexico Senate. Democrat Angelica Rubio won the open seat.

District 36
Incumbent Republican Andy Nuñez has represented the 36th district since 2015. He lost re-election to Democrat Nathan Small.

District 37
Incumbent Republican Terry McMillan has represented the 37th district since 2011. McMillan lost re-election to Democrat Joanne Ferrary.

District 38
Incumbent Republican Dianne Hamilton has represented the 38th district since 1999. Hamilton retired and fellow Republican Rebecca Dow won the open seat.

District 39
Incumbent Republican John L. Zimmerman has represented the 39th district since 2015. He lost re-election to Democrat Rodolpho Martinez.

District 40
Incumbent Democrat Nick Salazar has represented the 40th district since 1974.

District 41
Incumbent Democrat Debbie Rodella has represented the 41st district since 1993.

District 42
Incumbent Democrat Roberto Gonzales has represented the 42nd district since 1995.

District 43
Incumbent Democrat Stephanie Garcia Richard has represented the 43rd district since 2013.

District 44
Incumbent has represented the 44th district since 2003.

District 45
Incumbent Democrat Jim Trujillo has represented the 45th district since 2003.

District 46
Incumbent Democrat Carl Trujillo has represented the 46th district since 2013.

District 47
Incumbent Democrat Brian Egolf has represented the 47th district since 2009.

District 48
Incumbent Democrat Lucky Varela has represented the 48th district since 1987. Varela retired and fellow Democrat Linda Trujillo won the open seat.

District 49
Incumbent Republican House Speaker Don Tripp has represented the 49th district since 1999.

District 50
Incumbent Democrat Matthew McQueen has represented the 50th district since 2015.

District 51
Incumbent Republican Yvette Herrell has represented the 51st district since 2011.

District 52
Incumbent Democrat Doreen Gallegos has represented the 52nd district since 2013.

District 53
Incumbent Republican Ricky Little has represented the 53rd district since 2015.

District 54
Incumbent Republican Jim Townsend has represented the 54th district since 2015.

District 55
Incumbent Republican Cathrynn Brown has represented the 55th district since 2011.

District 56
Incumbent Republican Zachary Cook has represented the 56th district since 2009.

District 57
Incumbent Republican Jason Harper has represented the 57th district since 2013.

District 58
Incumbent Republican Candy Ezzell has represented the 58th district since 2005.

District 59
Incumbent Republican Nora Espinoza has represented the 59th district since 2007. Espinoza retired to run for Secretary of State. Republican Greg Nibert won the open seat.

District 60
Incumbent Republican Tim Lewis has represented the 60th district since 2011.

District 61
Incumbent Republican David Gallegos has represented the 61st district since 2013.

District 62
Incumbent Republican Larry Scott has represented the 62nd district since 2015.

District 63
Incumbent Democrat George Dodge Jr. has represented the 63rd district since 2011.

District 64
Incumbent Republican Randal Crowder has represented the 64th district since 2015.

District 65
Incumbent Democrat James Madalena has represented the 65th district since 1985. Madelena retired and fellow Democrat Derrick Lente won the open seat.

District 66
Incumbent Republican Bob Wooley has represented the 66th district since 2011.

District 67
Incumbent Republican Dennis Roch has represented the 67th district since 2009.

District 68
Incumbent Republican Monica Youngblood has represented the 68th district since 2013.

District 69
Incumbent Democrat Ken Martinez had represented the 69th district since 1999. Martinez resigned and Democrat Harry Garcia was appointed to replace him on September 9, 2016. Garcia was elected to a full term unopposed.

District 70
Incumbent Democrat Tomás Salazar has represented the 70th district since 2013.

See also
 2016 United States elections
 2016 United States House of Representatives elections in New Mexico
 2016 New Mexico elections
 Elections in New Mexico

References

External links

House
New Mexico House of Representatives elections
New Mexico House of Representatives